Mustafa Qazdal Mosque is a mosque in Qusar,  Azerbaijan.

See also
 Islam in Azerbaijan
 List of mosques in Azerbaijan

Mosques in Azerbaijan
Qusar District